El  Bujeo is a village in the municipality of Tarifa in the Province of Cadiz in southeastern Spain, It is located about   southwest of Algeciras, along the main road to the southern tip of Spain at Tarifa, which is  away, and it lies between the villages of El Pelayo and El Cuartón. According to the National Statistics Institute, El Bujeo had 212 inhabitants in 2010.  It lies within the Parque Natural del Estrecho, and woodland in the vicinity is said to offer a " diverse assemblage of breeding passerines."

See also
 Bujeo

References

Populated places in the Province of Cádiz
Tarifa